Rahling (Lorraine Franconian: Rahlinge) is a commune in the Moselle department of the Grand Est administrative region in north-eastern France.

The village belongs to the Pays de Bitche and to the Northern Vosges Regional Nature Park.

In 2010 the commune had 813 inhabitants (density: 38.2 people per km2).

See also
 Communes of the Moselle department

References

External links
 

Communes of Moselle (department)